Helladius was a Byzantine period grammarian, professor, and a priest of Zeus during the 4th and 5th centuries.

Biography
Helladius was a non-Christian, professor of some distinction in Alexandria, but fled the post once bloody fighting broke out between the pagans and Christians in 391 A.D., which escalated after the destruction of pagan temples was ordered by Theodosius I in 389. Helladius moved to Constantinople, and was back to actively teaching grammar by the reign of Theodosius II (408–450 A.D.), Socrates of Constantinople in his youth being one of his pupils. Helladius was granted comitiva ordinis primi by this emperor in 425 A.D., by virtue of which he became ranked among the ex vicarii.

Helladius compiled a Greek lexicon entitled λεξικὸν κατὰ στοιχεῖου or τῶν λέξεων συλλογή according to Photius; elsewhere it is stated the lexicon bore the title λέξεως παντοίας χρῆσις κατα στοῖχειον. Helladius was one of the important sources used by the Suda as well.

Notes

References

Attribution:

Byzantine grammarians
4th-century Byzantine writers
5th-century Byzantine writers